Mohamed Abdel Ellah (born March 7, 1968, in Asyut) is an Egyptian sport shooter. He tied for 11th place in the men's 10 metre air rifle event at the 2000 Summer Olympics.

References

1968 births
Living people
ISSF rifle shooters
Egyptian male sport shooters
Olympic shooters of Egypt
Shooters at the 2000 Summer Olympics
People from Asyut